KQTY (1490 AM) was a radio station broadcasting a talk radio format. Licensed to Borger, Texas, United States, the station was last owned by Zia Broadcasting Company. The station featured hourly newscasts from CBS Radio. Show hosts included Doug Stephan, Hugh Hewitt, Dennis Prager, Dana Loesch and Michael Medved.

On August 12, 2019, station management announced that it would cease operation on Friday, August 16, 2019, at 10 pm. The station's license was surrendered to the Federal Communications Commission and cancelled on September 15, 2020.

References

External links
FCC Station Search Details: DKQTY (Facility ID: 74564)
 (covering 1945-1980 as KRGH /  KHUZ /  KQTY)

QTY (AM)
Radio stations established in 1947
1947 establishments in Texas
Radio stations disestablished in 2020
2020 disestablishments in Texas
QTY (AM)
Defunct radio stations in the United States